was a Japanese samurai from Sakuma clan who served Oda Nobunaga. He is believed to be the first "general' killed by gunfire in Japan.

In 1556, Morishige fought at the Battle of Ino against Oda Nobuyuki.

In 1560, during the invasion of Owari Province by Imagawa Yoshimoto, leading up to the Battle of Okehazama, Morishige was appointed to defend the Marune fortress on the border of the province.

The fortress came under attack by Tokugawa Ieyasu (who was at that time named Matsudaira Motoyasu). During the Siege of Marune, Ieyasu made effective use of concentrated arquebus fire. Morishige was killed by a bullet, and the fortress fell to Imagawa forces.

References

Samurai
1560 deaths
Japanese warriors killed in battle
Year of birth unknown